Dean Haglund (born July 29, 1965) is a Canadian actor, known for the role of Richard "Ringo" Langly, one of The Lone Gunmen on The X-Files. Haglund is also a stand-up comedian, specializing in improvisational comedy, including work with the Vancouver TheatreSports League. In addition to The X-Files, he played the voice of Sid in Tom Sawyer, Haglund also portrayed Langly in the spin-off The Lone Gunmen, which aired thirteen episodes in 2001. He is the inventor of the  Chill Pak, a commercial external cooling product for laptop computers.

Early life and education
Haglund was born in Oakbank, Manitoba, Canada, and is the son of a structural engineer. His father is Swedish.

Career
After his roles on X-Files and The Lone Gunmen, Haglund appeared briefly in a documentary-style production called "From Here to Andromeda", released in 2007. The production has UFOs and extraterrestrials as a central theme. On October 30, 2009, he hosted Ghost Adventures Live on the Travel Channel. In a throwback to X-Files, Dean appeared in episode 95 of Bones as restaurant owner Blaine Miller in Roswell where Booth and Bones are sent to investigate a possible extraterrestrial sighting. He was on the advisory board of Sci-Fest, the first annual Los Angeles Science Fiction One-Act Play Festival, held in May 2014.

In June 2015, Haglund emigrated to Sydney, Australia with his girlfriend and their two dogs, and now lives in Newtown. Haglund's relocation to Australia nearly resulted in the removal of a planned cameo by the Lone Gunmen in the episode "Babylon" of the revived tenth season of The X-Files. However, he was informed by Bruce Harwood that the producers were looking for him, and contacted them to film the appearance. He currently hosts the Chillpak Hollywood Hour podcast, where he discusses all things Hollywood with independent filmmaker Phil Leirness.

Filmography

Television
The Commish (1992-1994) - Drug Dealer / Zack ("Video Vigilante" and "Working Girls")
Street Justice (1993) - Junkie ("The Wall")
The X-Files (1994-2018) - Richard Langly
Sliders (1995) - Stockboy ("Fever")
Lonesome Dove: The Series (1995) - Nathan Silas ("The Return")
Honey, I Shrunk the Kids: The TV Show (1998) - Mr. Coolidge ("Honey, It's No Fun Being an Illegal Alien")
Home Improvement (1999) - Guy ("Young at Heart")
V.I.P. (1999-2000) - Himself ("Val Goes to Town" and "Throw Val from the Train")
The Lone Gunmen (2001) - Richard Langly
Bones (2010) - Blaine Miller ("The X in the Files")
Femme Fatales (2011) - Kip ("Girls Gone Dead")
The Icarus II Project (2011) - Bernie ("Jessica")

Film
The X-Files (1998) - Richard Langly
Spectres (2004) - Dr. Halsey
Face of Terror (2004) - Timmons
Dead & Deader (2006) - Funeral Home Director (TV Movie)
Atlantis Down (2010) - Jack Spano
Geek USA (2013) - Sloan
The Lady Killers (2017) - Paul Lewis

References

External links
 
 Interview with Dean Haglund (2005), on Slice of SciFi

1965 births
20th-century Canadian comedians
20th-century Canadian male actors
21st-century Canadian comedians
21st-century Canadian male actors
Canadian male film actors
Canadian male comedians
Canadian stand-up comedians
Canadian male television actors
Living people
People from Oakbank, Manitoba
Male actors from Manitoba
Canadian emigrants to Australia
Comedians from Manitoba